Sophiya Haque (14 June 1971 – 17 January 2013) was an English actress, singer, video jockey and dancer. She is best known for playing the role of Poppy Morales in Coronation Street between 2008 and 2009.

Early life
Haque was born Syeda Sophia Haque in Portsmouth, Hampshire to a Bangladeshi father and a British Jewish mother. She was the youngest of three daughters.

She was brought up by her mother, Thelma, a schoolteacher. She attended Priory School in Portsmouth, and took dancing lessons from the age of two and a half at Mary Forrester's Rainbow School of Dance before moving at the age of 13 to London (where she lived with her father, Amirul Haque, a restaurateur, and his second wife), training full-time at the Arts Educational Schools, London.

Career
Haque started as the lead vocalist in the band Akasa; they signed a deal with Warner Bros. in 1988. Subsequently, she worked as a video jockey for MTV Asia for seven years and Channel V.

Haque was employed as a presenter at STAR TV in Hong Kong in 1992. From 1994, she began appearing on TV in India and in 1997 she moved to Mumbai full-time to work on the Channel V India service. Her first Bollywood film was Khoobsurat, and she later made several more including Mangal Pandey: The Rising.

In 2002, Haque returned to the United Kingdom to star as Rani in Andrew Lloyd Webber's Bombay Dreams. In 2005, she starred as Janoo Rani in the West End theatre musical production of The Far Pavilions. In 2012, she starred as Soraya in Wah! Wah! Girls.

In 2008, she took a small supporting role in the film Wanted. Between December 2008 and June 2009, she played Poppy Morales, the barmaid and assistant manager of the Rovers Return, in Coronation Street and by coincidence, shared her dressing room with Coronation Street's Auntie Pam played by actress Kate Anthony, who was also her first cousin.

In 2012, she appeared in BBC's Fairy Tales series and in 15 episodes of House of Anubis as Senkhara. She was diagnosed with cancer when she was working in the Michael Grandage production of Privates on Parade, playing the role of, Sylvia Morgan, a Welsh-Indian singer and dancer performing for the British troops in Malaya in 1948.

Personal life and death
Haque lived in Knaphill, Surrey, with her partner, musical director David White, and the couple were in the process of building a houseboat when she fell ill.

Around Christmas 2012, Haque was diagnosed with cancer. She developed a lung clot and pneumonia and in the early hours of 17 January 2013, she died in her sleep in a London hospital, while undergoing tests.

Filmography

Film

Television

Theatre

References

External links

1971 births
2013 deaths
20th-century English actresses
21st-century English actresses
Deaths from cancer in England
English actresses of South Asian descent
English dance musicians
English female dancers
English film actresses
English people of Bangladeshi descent
English women singers
English soap opera actresses
English stage actresses
English television actresses
English television presenters
Actresses from Portsmouth
British VJs (media personalities)
People from the Borough of Woking
Mass media people from Portsmouth